Zoquiapam may refer to:

Nuevo Zoquiapam, a town and municipality in Oaxaca in south-western Mexico
San Lucas Zoquiapam, a town and municipality in Oaxaca in south-western Mexico

See also
Zoquiapan, a town and municipality in Puebla in south-eastern Mexico